Earl Edward Cramer (December 2, 1896 – June 1, 1962) was a professional football player with the Akron Pros (renamed the Akron Indians in 1926) and the Cleveland Tigers of the National Football League.  In 1923, he served as a player-coach for the Pros. He split coaching duties that season with Dutch Hendrian. Cramer was the all-time leading scorer for the Akron Pros. He was educated in Hamline University.

Notes

1896 births
1962 deaths
Players of American football from Minnesota
Hamline Pipers football players
Akron Indians players
Akron Pros coaches
Akron Pros players
Cleveland Tigers (NFL) players